Stephen Clarendon Phillips (November 4, 1801 – June 26, 1857) was a Representative from Massachusetts.

Phillips was born in Salem, Massachusetts, to Stephen and Dorcas (Woodbridge) Phillips. He was a descendant of Rev. George Phillips of Watertown, the progenitor of the New England Phillips family in America. He graduated from Harvard University in 1819. Phillips' engaged in mercantile pursuits in Salem, and was a member of the Massachusetts House of Representatives from 1824 to 1829. He then served in the Massachusetts State Senate in 1830.

Phillips was elected as a National Republican to the Twenty-third Congress to fill the vacancy caused by the resignation of Rufus Choate. He was reelected as a National Republican to the Twenty-fourth Congress, and elected as a Whig to the Twenty-fifth Congress serving from December 1, 1834, to September 28, 1838, when he resigned.

Phillips was mayor of Salem from 1838 to 1842, but was defeated as the Free-Soil candidate for governor in 1848 and 1849. He engaged in the lumber business in Canada. He perished in the burning of the steamer Montreal on the St. Lawrence River on June 26, 1857, near Quebec City.  His body was never found, but there is a monument to him in Harmony Grove Cemetery in Salem.

References

1801 births
1857 deaths
Harvard University alumni
Members of the Massachusetts House of Representatives
Massachusetts state senators
Mayors of Salem, Massachusetts
Massachusetts National Republicans
Massachusetts Free Soilers
Phillips family (New England)
Accidental deaths in Quebec
Deaths due to ship fires
National Republican Party members of the United States House of Representatives
Whig Party members of the United States House of Representatives from Massachusetts
19th-century American politicians